Paracalyx balfourii is a species of legume in the family Fabaceae. It is found only in Yemen. Its natural habitats are subtropical or tropical dry forests and rocky areas.

References

Phaseoleae
Endemic flora of Socotra
Least concern plants
Taxonomy articles created by Polbot